Marquess of Casa Irujo  is a hereditary  title of Spanish nobility. It was created on 8 March 1803 by King Charles IV of Spain in favor of Carlos Martínez de Irujo, the Spanish minister to the United States from 1796 to 1807.

Marquesses of Casa Irujo (1803)
 Carlos Martínez de Irujo y Tacón, 1st Marquess of Casa Irujo (1803-1824)
 Carlos Martínez de Irujo y McKean, 2nd Marquess of Casa Irujo (1824-1855)
 Carlos Martínez de Irujo y del Alcázar, 3rd Marquess of Casa Irujo (1855-1904)
 Carlos Martínez de Irujo y Caro, 4th Marquess of Casa Irujo (1904-1906)
 Pedro Martínez de Irujo y Caro, 5th Marquess of Casa Irujo (1906-1942)
 Ignacio Martínez de Irujo y Artázcoz, 6th Marquess of Casa Irujo (1942-1980)
 Carlos Martínez de Irujo y Crespo, 7th Marquess of Casa Irujo (1980- )

References

Marquessates in the Spanish nobility
Noble titles created in 1803